The Southern Cross is a 2003 Argentine drama film directed by Pablo Reyero. It was screened in the Un Certain Regard section at the 2003 Cannes Film Festival.

Cast
 Letizia Lestido - Nora
 Luciano Suardi - Javier
 Humberto Tortonese - Wendy
 Mario Paolucci - Rodolfo
 Silvia Baylé - Mercedes
 Oscar Alegre - Negro

References

External links

2003 films
2003 drama films
Argentine drama films
2000s Spanish-language films
Films directed by Pablo Reyero
2000s Argentine films